is a railway station in the Ebisu neighborhood of Tokyo's Shibuya ward, operated by East Japan Railway Company (JR East) and the Tokyo subway operator Tokyo Metro. The station is named after Yebisu Beer, which was once brewed in an adjacent brewery, and which is itself named for the Japanese deity Ebisu.

Lines
Ebisu is served by the following lines:
East Japan Railway Company (JR East)
Yamanote Line
Saikyō Line
Shōnan-Shinjuku Line
Tokyo Metro
Hibiya Line

JR East station

Platforms
The JR East station consists of two island platforms serving four tracks.

Station melody
The melody known as "The Third Man Theme" (or as the "Ebisu Theme" in Japan) is played at the platforms just prior to train departures. This melody was used in Ebisu beer TV commercials. Most of the many of thousands of people who pass through the station each day probably do not realize that the song was made famous by the 1949 Orson Welles film noir, The Third Man, written by Graham Greene and featuring a very dark subject matter, the sale of fake penicillin in post-World War Vienna. The song, played on the zither by the previously unknown Austrian musician, Anton Karas, was a huge international hit in 1949 and 1950.

Tokyo Metro station

Platforms
The subway station has two side platforms serving two tracks.

History
The station first opened in 1901 as a freight terminal for the neighboring Yebisu Beer factory. Passenger trains began to stop at the station on 30 September 1906. The Tokyo Tamagawa tram line was extended to the station in 1927. In May 1945, the station building burned to the ground amid the bombing of Tokyo. The subway station opened on 25 March 1964 and the tram service was discontinued in 1967.

The Sapporo Brewery at Ebisu and its accompanying rail freight terminal were closed in 1982. The space was used for a "car train" service for several years before being redeveloped as the Ebisu Garden Place high-rise complex.

The Saikyo Line was extended to Ebisu in 1996. Through service to the Shonan-Shinjuku Line began in 2001, and to the Rinkai Line in 2002. Between 1996 and 2002, Ebisu served as the southern passenger terminus of the Saikyo Line, with Osaki Station being used as a turnaround point but not having passenger platforms connected to the line.

The station facilities of the Hibiya Line were inherited by Tokyo Metro after the privatization of the Teito Rapid Transit Authority (TRTA) in 2004.

Chest-height platform edge doors were introduced on the two Yamanote Line platforms from 26 June 2010, the first time that such doors were installed on a JR line other than the Shinkansen.

Station numbering was introduced to the JR East platforms in 2016 with Ebisu being assigned station numbers JA09 for the Saikyo Line, JS18 for the Shonan-Shinjuku line,  JY21 for the Yamanote Line. At the same time, JR East assigned the station a 3-letter code; Ebisu was assigned the code "EBS".

Passenger statistics
In fiscal 2019, the JR East station was used by 145,805 passengers daily (boarding passengers only), making it the 20th-busiest station operated by JR East. In fiscal 2019, the Tokyo Metro station was used by an average of 117,796 passengers per day (exiting and entering passengers), making it the 30th-busiest station operated by Tokyo Metro.

The daily passenger figures for each operator in previous years are as shown below.

 Note that JR East figures are for boarding passengers only.

See also

 List of railway stations in Japan

References

External links

 JR East Ebisu Station information 
 JR East Ebisu Station information 
 Tokyo Metro Ebisu Station information 
 Tokyo Metro Ebisu Station information 

Railway stations in Tokyo
Saikyō Line
Buildings and structures in Shibuya
Shōnan-Shinjuku Line
Stations of East Japan Railway Company
Stations of Tokyo Metro
Tokyo Metro Hibiya Line
Yamanote Line
Railway stations in Japan opened in 1964